The Chicago mayoral election of 2003 saw incumbent Mayor Richard M. Daley easily reelected against small and divided opposition, resulting in his best electoral showing of his career, winning by a landslide 64 point margin.

By winning his fifth mayoral election, Daley tied Carter Harrison Sr. and Carter Harrison Jr. for the second-most mayoral election victories in Chicago history. Daley would subsequently win an additional mayoral election in 2007, thereby surpassing both Harrisons and tying his own father's record for the most mayoral election victories.

Campaign
On December 9, 2002, a spokesperson for Daley confirmed that Daley would be announcing his candidacy for reelection. Daley's candidacy was widely anticipated. A popular incumbent, Daley had won strong victories in the preceding four consecutive mayoral elections.

All three of Daley's opponents were African Americans. Both Jakes, and  McAfee were clergy. McAllister was a businesswoman.

Also briefly challenging Daley, but withdrawing from the race, had been James Meeks.

All of Daley's opponents on the ballot had little electoral experience. They struggled in fundraising and failed to receive backing from black leaders. They also lacked name recognition. Their prospects of unseating Daley were seen as dim.

While the election was nonpartisan, all candidates running were Democrats.

As was the case in all of his reelection campaigns, Daley did not attend any debates.

Endorsements

Results
The election saw what was, up to that point, the lowest turnout in Chicago mayoral election history. Daley won a majority of the vote in each of the city's 50 wards.

Results by ward

References

2003
Chicago
2003 Illinois elections
2000s in Chicago
2003 in Illinois
Richard M. Daley